Phospholipase A2 group IVE is a protein that in humans is encoded by the PLA2G4E gene.

Function

This gene encodes a member of the cytosolic phospholipase A2 group IV family. Members of this family are involved in regulation of membrane tubule-mediated transport. The enzyme encoded by this member of the family plays a role in trafficking through the clathrin-independent endocytic pathway. The enzyme regulates the recycling process via formation of tubules that transport internalized clathrin-independent cargo proteins back to the cell surface. [provided by RefSeq, Jan 2017].

References

Further reading